Billal Sebaihi (born May 31, 1992) is a French professional footballer who currently plays as an midfielder for Žalgiris.

Career
In July 2015, he left Beira-Mar and moved to Primeira Liga club Estoril. He signed for a 3-year contract keeping him with the club till 2018 and a buyout clause of €3 million.

On 16 January 2020, Sebaihi joined Kazakhstan Premier League club FC Kaisar on trial in Turkey.

On 18 January 2023, Žalgiris announced the signing of Sebaihi.

References

External links

1992 births
Living people
Footballers from Lyon
French footballers
Association football midfielders
Championnat National 2 players
Algerian Ligue Professionnelle 1 players
CS Constantine players
Anadia F.C. players
Liga Portugal 2 players
S.C. Beira-Mar players
Primeira Liga players
G.D. Estoril Praia players
C.D. Tondela players
TFF First League players
Manisaspor footballers
Boluspor footballers
French expatriate sportspeople in Portugal
Expatriate footballers in Portugal
French expatriate sportspeople in Turkey
Expatriate footballers in Turkey